Dávid Palkó (born 7 February 1989 in Szombathely) is a Hungarian football player who currently plays for ASK Horitschon-Unterpetersdorf.

He played professionally for Videoton FC Fehérvár and Lombard-Pápa TFC in the Nemzeti Bajnokság.

References 

1989 births
Living people
Hungarian footballers
Szombathelyi Haladás footballers
Sportspeople from Szombathely
FC Sopron players
Association football forwards
Fehérvár FC players
Hungarian expatriate sportspeople in Austria
SV Mattersburg players
Lombard-Pápa TFC footballers
Expatriate footballers in Austria
FC Felcsút players
Hungarian expatriate footballers